The order of battle for the Battle of South Guangxi by country is as follows:

Japan
21st  Army (to Feb. 9th 1940) –  Lt. Gen. Rikichi Andō 7]

22nd  Army (10 Feb 1940 – 19 Nov 1940,- Army disbanded) – Lt. Gen Seiichi Kuno
 5th Division – General Hitoshi Imamura (9 Nov 1938 – 9 Mar 1940), Lt. General Aketo Nakamura (9 Mar 1940 – 15 Oct 1940), Lt. General Takuro Matsui (15 Oct 1940 – 11 May 1942) 7]
 9th Infantry Brigade
 11th Infantry Regiment
 41st Infantry Regiment
 21st Infantry Brigade – Major Gen. Masao Nakamura
 21st Infantry Regiment
 42nd Infantry Regiment
 5th Mountain Artillery Regiment
 5th Cavalry Regiment
 5th Engineer Regiment
 5th Transport Regiment
 Formosa Mixed Brigade- Major Gen. Sadaichi Shioda [7]
 1st Formosa Infantry Regiment
 2nd Formosa Infantry Regiment
 Formosa Artillery Regiment
 Formosa Military Engineer Regiment

January 1940 reinforcements from Canton

 18th Division – Lt. Gen. Seiichi Kuno [7]
 23rd Infantry Brigade
 55th Infantry Regiment
 56th Infantry Regiment
 35th Infantry Brigade
 114th Infantry Regiment
 124th Infantry Regiment
 18th Mountain Artillery Regiment
 22nd Cavalry Battalion
 12th Engineer Regiment
 12th Transport Regiment
 Guards Mixed Brigade – Major Gen. Takeshi Sakurada [7]
 1st Guards Infantry Regiment
 2nd Guards Infantry Regiment
 Guards Cavalry Regiment
 Guards Field Artillery Regiment (elements)
 Guards Engineer Regiment (elements)
 Guards Transport Regiment (elements)

Army Airforce:
 21st Independent Aviation Corps, IJA  – ?
 Independent 82nd Dokuritsu Hiko Chutai [S. China]  – ?
 Light bomber squadron. (reconnaissance aircraft)
 Independent 84th Dokuritsu Hiko Chutai [Canton] – Captain Magoji Hara
 Nakajima Ki-27 (fighter aircraft)

Navy Airforce:
 5th Fleet  – Adm. Nobutake Kondō   [7]
 2nd Air Sentai – ?
 Akagi [southern China] (end/04/39 – middle/02/40) 	
 Fighter Daitai –  Mitsubishi A5M
 Bomber Daitai – Aichi D1A2
 Attack Daitai – Yokosuka B4Y1
 11th Destroyer Division-- and 
 Kamikawa Maru – seaplane carrier
 Chiyoda – seaplane carrier
 3rd Combined Air Unit
 14th Kōkūtai, IJN [based in Nanning from late 12/39] – ? 
 Fighter Daitai – 13 Mitsubishi A5M

Notes:  
 Initial landing and advance to Nanning by 5th Division and Taiwan Composite Brigade. Guards Mixed Brigade and the 18th Division were sent as reinforcements from Canton area in January 1940.

After 9 February 1940, the 18th Division was returned to Canton and the 21st Army was disbanded, the forces of the 21st Army came under the control of the Southern China Area Army (Canton) under General Rikichi Andō (10 Feb 1940 – 5 Oct 1940) and General Jun Ushiroku (5 Oct 1940 – 26 Jun 1941).  The forces remaining in Guangxi, now subordinate to South China Front Army, became the Japanese Twenty-Second Army under Lt. Gen Seiichi Kuno (10 Feb 1940 – 19 Nov 1940), until the Army was disbanded at the end of the campaign.  On June 3, 1940, the Guards Mixed Brigade became the 1st Guards Brigade of the 1st Guards Division. The 2nd Imperial Guards Infantry Regiment under Col. Kunio Osonoe from 1st Guards Brigade was assigned to the Indochina Expeditionary Army in September, 1940. In October 1940, the remainder of 1st Guards Brigade (1st Guard Regiment and support units) joined other Japanese units occupying French Indochina.

China
Generalissimo's HQ in Kweilin – Pai Chung-hsi  
 16th Army Group – Wei Yun-sun  *
 31st Corps –  Wei Yun-sun
 131st Division
 135th Division
 188th Division
 46th Corps – Ho Hsuan
 170th Division
 175th Division
 New 19th Division
 26th Army Group –  Tsai Ting-kai *
 1st  Sep. Inf. Regts.
 2nd Sep. Inf. Regts.
 3rd Sep. Inf. Regts.
 4th Sep. Inf. Regts.
 35th Army Group – Teng Lung-kuang
 64th Corps – Chen Kung-hsia
 155th Division
 156th Division
 37th Army Group – Yeh Chao
 66th Corps – Yeh Chao
 159th Division
 160th Division
 38th Army Group – Hsu Ting-yao
 2nd Corps – Li Yen-nien
 9th Division
 76th Division
 5th Corps – Tu Yu-ming
 200th Division (Mechanized Division) – Tu Yu-ming
 598th Infantry regiment (with Soviet trucks)
 599th Infantry regiment (with Soviet trucks)
 600th Infantry regiment (with Soviet trucks)
 Armored vehicle regiment (50 BA type armored cars)
 Armored  regiment (70 T-26, 4 BT-5, 18-20 CV-33's)
 Motorized Artillery regiment (122mm howitzers, 75mm field guns and 45mm AT guns)
 New 22nd Division
 1st Honor Division
 9th Corps – Kan Li-chu
 49th Division
 93rd Division
 2nd Reserve Division
 99th Corps – Fu Chung-fang
 92nd Division
 99th Division
 118th Division
 36th Corps – Yao Chuen
 5th Division
 96th Division
 43rd Division
 New 3rd Division
 Kwangsi Pacification HQ
 Artillery Detachment

Air Forces: **
 C A F 2nd Route Force  – Colonel Chang Ting-Meng
 100 planes 
 115 planes 
 3rd Pursuit Group – Huang Panyang
 7th Pursuit Squadron – Lu Tian-Long
 Polikarpov I-15
 8th Pursuit Squadron – ?
  Polikarpov I-15
 27th Pursuit Squadron -
  Gloster Gladiator Mk. I, Polikarpov I-
 29th Pursuit Squadron -
 Gloster Gladiator Mk. I, Polikarpov I-
 32nd Pursuit Squadron – Wei Yi-Ging
 Gloster Gladiator Mk. I, Polikarpov I-15bis
 4th Pursuit Group – Liu Chi-Han
 21st Pursuit Squadron – Lo Ying-Teh
 Polikarpov I-15bis -
 22nd Pursuit Squadron – Cheng Hsiao-Yu
 Polikarpov I-15bis -
 23rd Pursuit Squadron – ?
 Polikarpov I-15bis -
 24th Pursuit Squadron – Su Xian-Ren
 Polikarpov I-16
 5th Pursuit Group ?
 17th Pursuit Squadron – Captain Cen Zeliu
 Polikarpov I-15bis, Dewoitine D.510
 26th Pursuit Squadron – ?
 Polikarpov I-16
 28th Pursuit Squadron – Major Louie Yim-Qun (reassigned to the 3rd PG on 1 October 1938 - Maj. Chen Ruidian)
 Gloster Gladiator Mk. I, Polikarpov I-15bis
 29th Pursuit Squadron – Captain Ma Kwok-Lim
 Polikarpov I-15bis
 6th Bomber Group – ?
 19th Bomber Squadron – ?
 Tupolev SB-2
 18th Pursuit Squadron – Major Yang Yibai
 Curtiss Hawk III, Curtiss Hawk 75
 Soviet Suprun Group – K. K. Kokkinaki
 Polikarpov I-16

Notes:

1. 16th Army Group  and 26th Army Group were original defenders of Gwangxi.  Other units were reinforcements which gradually arrived from Hunan, Gwangtung, and Szechuan.

2. On 18 December the Chinese launched a successful counter-offensive against the Japanese in the Kwangsi Province.  To support the Chinese Kwangsi-offensive and direct the air-units the more experienced 1st ARC (Colonel Chang Ting-Meng) temporarily replaced the 2nd ARC (Colonel Hsing Chan-Fei) at Liuchou, with the 2nd ARC moving to rear positions at Kwei-Lin.

Taking part in the offensive were 115 aircraft of the 3rd, 4th and 5th PGs, 6th BG, 18th PS and one of the Soviet groups.

References

Bibliography

 Cheung, Raymond. OSPREY AIRCRAFT OF THE ACES 126: Aces of the Republic of China Air Force. Oxford: Bloomsbury Publishing Plc, 2015. .
 徐 (Xú), 露梅 (Lùméi). 隕落 (Fallen): 682位空军英烈的生死档案 - 抗战空军英烈档案大解密 (A Decryption of 682 Air Force Heroes of The War of Resistance-WWII and Their Martyrdom). 东城区, 北京， 中国: 团结出版社, 2016. .

Second Sino-Japanese War orders of battle
Battles of the Second Sino-Japanese War